Fie Thorsted Hækkerup (born 25 July 1994) is a Danish politician and member of the Folketing, the national legislature. A Social Democrat, she has represented North Zealand since November 2022.

Hækkerup was born on 25 July 1994 in Hillerød. She is the daughter of Nick Hækkerup, former Justice Minister. Several of her other relatives have also been members of the Folketing. She has a Master of Arts degree in Danish from the University of Copenhagen (2020). She was a consultant at public affairs company Rud Pedersen from 2020 to 2022.

Hækkerup is married to Mikkel Juul Hækkerup.

References

External links

1994 births
21st-century Danish women politicians
Living people
Members of the Folketing 2022–2026
People from Assens Municipality
Social Democrats (Denmark) politicians
University of Copenhagen alumni
Women members of the Folketing